The 28th National Film Awards, presented by Directorate of Film Festivals, the organisation set up by Ministry of Information and Broadcasting, India to felicitate the best of Indian Cinema released in the year 1980. Ceremony took place in April 1981.

Juries 

Two different committees were formed for feature films and short films, headed by V. Shantaram and B. D. Garga respectively.

 Jury Members: Feature Films
 V. Shantaram (Chairperson)Basanta ChoudhuryB. V. DharapSunil GangopadhyayR. N. K. PrasadRavindranathan NairArthur J. PaisPurnendu Sekhar PattreaJayoo PatwardhanT. S. RangaKantilal RathodMriganka Sekhar RayShobhna SamarthN. SeshadriK. B. TilakG. Venkateshwara Rao
 Jury Members: Short Films
 B. D. Garga (Chairperson)Utpal K. BanerjeeP. D. P. Rao

Awards 

Awards were divided into feature films and non-feature films.

Lifetime Achievement Award

Feature films 

Feature films were awarded at All India as well as regional level. For 28th National Film Awards, a Bengali film, Akaler Shandhaney won the National Film Award for Best Feature Film also winning the maximum number of awards (four), along with a Malayalam film, Oppol. Following were the awards given in each category:

All India Award 

Following were the awards given:

Regional Award 

The awards were given to the best films made in the regional languages of India. For feature films in English, Gujarati, Kannada, Kashmiri, Meitei, Marathi and Oriya language, award for Best Feature Film was not given.

Non-Feature films 

Following were the awards given:

Awards not given 

Following were the awards not given as no film was found to be suitable for the award:

 Best Children's Film
 Best Film on Family Welfare
 Best Lyrics
 Best Popular Film Providing Wholesome Entertainment
 Best Film on Social Documentation
 Best Animation Film
 Best Feature Film in English
 Best Feature Film in Kannada
 Best Feature Film in Manipuri
 Best Feature Film in Marathi
 Best Feature Film in Oriya

References

External links 
 National Film Awards Archives
 Official Page for Directorate of Film Festivals, India

National Film Awards (India) ceremonies
1981 Indian film awards